The 1978 Dallas Cowboys season was their 19th in the National Football League (NFL). For the third consecutive season, the Cowboys finished in first place in the NFC East. The Cowboys scored 384 points, which ranked first in the league, while the defense only gave up 208 points, 3rd best in the league. Twice, the Cowboys appeared on Monday Night Football.

The Cowboys became the first franchise to appear in five Super Bowls. With their loss to Pittsburgh in Super Bowl XIII, they also became the first team to lose a Super Bowl after having won it the previous year.

Draft

Regular season
The defending Super Bowl champions were again led by quarterback Roger Staubach. Staubach finished the season as the top rated passer in the NFL (84.9) by throwing 231 out of 413 completions for 3,190 yards and 25 touchdowns, with 16 interceptions. He also rushed for 182 yards and another touchdown. Wide receivers Drew Pearson and Tony Hill provided the deep passing threats, combining for 90 receptions, 537 yards, and 7 touchdowns. Tight end Billy Joe Dupree contributed 34 receptions for 509 yards and 9 touchdowns. Running back Tony Dorsett had another fine season, recording a total of 1703 combined rushing and receiving yards, and scoring a total of 9 touchdowns. Fullback Robert Newhouse and halfback Preston Pearson also contributed from the offensive backfield, combining for 1,326 rushing and receiving yards, while Newhouse also scored 10 touchdowns.  The Cowboys also had a superb offensive line, led by Herbert Scott and 12-time Pro Bowler Rayfield Wright

The Cowboys' "Doomsday Defense" finished the season as the top-ranked defense in the league against the run by only allowing 107.6 yards per game. Pro Bowl linemen Ed "Too Tall" Jones, Harvey Martin and Randy White anchored the line, while linebackers Bob Breunig, D. D. Lewis and Thomas "Hollywood" Henderson provided solid support.  Their secondary, led by safeties Cliff Harris and Charlie Waters, along with cornerbacks Benny Barnes and Aaron Kyle, combined for 16 interceptions.

The Cowboys started the regular season slowly, winning only six of their first ten games. Both the offense and the defense played ineffectively, including giving up interceptions and fumbles. Dallas finished strong, winning their last six regular season games to post a 12–4 record.

In the aftermath of the season, NFL Films produced its annual highlight reel as it does for every NFL team.  Notable of the highlight reel was the title "America's Team".  It would come to be a label that would define the Dallas Cowboys for the rest of their history.  However, the label is most remembered for the Cowboys of this era, appearing in three Super Bowls in four years and claiming a unique spotlight in the American consciousness.

Schedule

Division opponents are in bold text

Game notes

Week 1

Week 2

Source: Pro-Football-Reference.com

Week 3

The week-3 contest between the Rams and Cowboys was a hard-fought early season match-up between two rivals who hated each other. Twice the Rams led by a touchdown during the game, only to have the Cowboys come back to even up the score. With the game tied at 14–14 in the 4th quarter, QB-Pat Haden connected with WR-Willie Miller for a 43-yard touchdown reception to increase the Rams lead by 6-points. But, after the Rams FG-kicker (Frank Corral) missed the easy extra point the score remained 20–14, leaving the Rams desperately clinging to a 6-point lead against a Cowboys team well known for pulling-out close games late in the 4th-quarter.

However, the Rams defense abruptly put an end to the Cowboys hopes of engineering another last minute victory after DB-Rod Perry intercepted a pass from QB-Roger Staubach and returned it for a 43-yrd TD to secure the Rams 27–14 victory. In response to Perry's game winning interception return, over 65,000 fans that filled Los Angeles Memorial Coliseum that day simultaneously erupted into a bedlam of deafening cheers. Then, what started off as an extremely raucous celebration soon developed into jeering and taunting of the Cowboys during the last few minutes of the game, by both the fans and quite a few of the Rams players too. This provoked a very rare angry response from Staubach, who was seen pointing his finger at the boisterous Rams players on the sideline, telling them that the Cowboys "will get them" the next time they meet each other.

Week 4

Week 5

Week 6

Week 7

Week 8

Week 9

Week 10

Week 11

Week 12

Source: Pro-Football-Reference.com

Week 13

Week 14

Week 15

Week 16

Standings

Roster

Postseason

NFC Divisional Playoff

Dallas' "Doomsday Defense" limited Atlanta quarterback Steve Bartkowski to only 8 completions in 23 attempts and intercepted him 3 times en route to victory. After the Falcons led 20–13 at halftime, the Cowboys scored 14 unanswered points in the second half.

NFC Championship Game

After a scoreless first half, the Cowboys opened the floodgates in the second half while the "Doomsday Defense" kept top-seeded Rams off of the scoreboard by intercepting Pat Haden three times, including a late pick six by Thomas "Hollywood" Henderson, to help Dallas advance to their second straight Super Bowl. This would be the Cowboys' last playoff win wearing their navy blue uniforms until the 2022 season.

Super Bowl XIII

Super Bowl XIII can arguably be called the greatest collection of NFL talent ever to gather for a game.  In additions to Coaches Noll and Landry, 16 players would go on to enshrinement in the Hall of Fame: 9 from Pittsburgh (Bradshaw, Harris, Swann, Stallworth, Webster, Greene, Lambert, Ham, and Blount), and 7 from Dallas (Staubach, Dorsett, Drew Pearson, Randy White, Rayfield Wright, Cliff Harris and Jackie Smith).

Much of the pregame hype surrounding Super Bowl XIII centered around Cowboys linebacker Thomas "Hollywood" Henderson. Henderson caused quite a stir before the NFC Championship Game by claiming that the Rams had "no class" and the Cowboys would shut them out. His prediction turned out to be very accurate; the Cowboys did shut them out, aided by Henderson's 68-yard interception return for a touchdown.

In the days leading up the Super Bowl, Henderson began talking about the Steelers in the same manner. He predicted another shutout and then made unfriendly comments about several Pittsburgh players. He put down the talent and the intelligence of Bradshaw, proclaiming "Bradshaw couldn't spell 'cat' if you spotted him the 'c' and the 'a'".  But the Steelers refused to get into a war of words with Henderson. Greene responded by saying the Steelers didn't need to say they were the best, they would just go out on the field and "get the job done".

Season recap
There was a lot of bitter feelings between the Dallas Cowboys and the LA Rams prior to their '78 NFC Championship contest. Both the Cowboys and Vikings shared a common recent history of eliminating the LA Rams from the playoffs the last 5-seasons in a row. Consigning the Rams to being labeled, "next year's champions" for most of the 1970s. So, when the undefeated (2-0) Cowboys traveled to Los Angeles to play the undefeated (2-0) Rams during week-3 of the 1978 regular season, the Rams were looking for blood. Not only did the Rams want to beat the Cowboys for a measure of revenge and early bragging rights, but they could use a victory over last year's Super Bowl champions to make a statement to the media and the rest of the league, "That 1978 was the year the Rams finally win a championship".

The week-3 contest between the Rams and Cowboys was a hard-fought early season match-up between two rivals who hated each other. Twice the Rams led by a touchdown only to have the Cowboys come back to even the score. With the game tied at 14–14 in the 4th quarter, QB-Pat Haden connected with WR-Willie Miller for a 43-yard touchdown reception to increase the Rams lead by 6-points. But, after the Rams FG-kicker (Frank Corral) missed the easy extra point the score remained 20–14, leaving the Rams desperately clinging to a 6-point lead against a Cowboys team well known for pulling-out close games late in the 4th-quarter.

However, the Rams defense abruptly put an end to the Cowboys hopes of engineering another last minute victory after DB-Rod Perry intercepted a pass from QB-Roger Staubach and returned it for a 43-yrd TD to secure the Rams 27–14 victory. In response to Perry's game winning interception return, over 65,000 fans that filled Los Angeles Memorial Coliseum that day simultaneously erupted into a bedlam of deafening cheers. Then, what started off as an extremely raucous celebration soon developed into jeering and taunting of the Cowboys during the last few minutes of the game, by both the fans and quite a few of the Rams players too. This provoked a very rare angry response from Staubach, who was seen pointing his finger at the boisterous Rams players on the sideline, telling them that the Cowboys "will get them" the next time they meet each other.

The Cowboys returned to Los Angeles later that same season to play for the NFC Championship against the #1 seeded Rams. Both teams entered the playoffs with a 12-4 regular season record. Both teams defeated their first round opponents at home, which included a Rams 34-10 blowout over their other playoff nemesis, the Minnesota Vikings. And, as a result of that emotionally charged week-3 loss to the Rams, the Cowboys had to win the NFC Championship at the Coliseum in front of 67,470 hostile LA fans to earn a return trip to the Super Bowl to face the Pittsburgh Steelers, who had already won the AFC Championship against the Houston Oilers earlier that same day.

The stage was set for an epic NFC Championship match, and fueling the already combustible tensions was Cowboys LB-Thomas "Hollywood" Henderson. Earlier in the week, the national (and international) media had descended upon Thomas Henderson the day after the Cowboys' 27-20 1st round playoff victory over the Atlanta Falcons. Thomas was more than eager to feed them some controversial meat to chew on. Thomas began the week by suggesting that the reason the Rams never went to a Super Bowl was because they had "no class" as a team and organization. Thomas later claimed the Rams are a team of chokers, and the Rams were going to choke again in their upcoming game against the Cowboys.

The much anticipated NFC Championship game between the Rams and Cowboys began as a scoreless defensive struggle for nearly three quarters of play, which included Rams kicker Frank Corral missing two field goal attempts in the first half. However, Dallas eventually broke the scoreless match wide open late in the 3rd-quarter after forcing five 2nd-half turnovers that would eventually lead to a 28-point victory for the Cowboys. Earning them the opportunity to defend their NFL championship in Super Bowl XIII.

As usual, the Rams defense proved to be a tough nut to crack for the Cowboys offense, but, it all began to go horribly wrong for the Rams after Dallas safety Charlie Waters intercepted a pass and returned it to the Rams 10-yard line with 1:52 left in the 3rd-quarter. Five plays later, RB-Tony Dorsett (who finished the game with 101 rushing yards) scored on a 5-yard touchdown run to give the Cowboys a 7–0 lead. On the Rams next possession, Charlie Waters snatched his 2nd interception of the game, which quickly set-up Staubach's 4-yard TD pass to FB-Scott Laidlaw, making it a 14-0 contest early in the 4th quarter. On the play that Rams QB-Pat Haden threw his 2nd interception, Haden's passing hand collided with DT-Randy White's helmet as he released the ball. Resulting in a broken right thumb and sidelining Haden for the rest of the game.

With 8:30 left in the 4th-quarter and the Rams still down 14–0, backup QB-Vince Ferragamo hit WR-Willie Miller along the sideline for a 65-yard pass, giving the Rams a 1st-down on the Cowboys 10-yard line and a chance to get back in the game. However, on a 1st-and-goal the Rams RB-Cullen Bryant fumbled the handoff and DE-Harvey Martin quickly recovered the ball at the 11-yard line. From there, the Cowboys marched 89-yards to score their 3rd offensive touchdown which featured a 53-yard run by Tony Dorsett, that eventually set-up an 11-yard TD reception from Staubach to TE-Billy Joe Dupree.

With the Cowboys sitting comfortably on top a 21–0 lead late in the 4th quarter, the CBS cameras panned over to Thomas Henderson standing on the sideline with their TV microphone on. Seizing the opportunity, Thomas looked directly at the camera and told the several million viewers, "It's 21-0, the Rams are choking, and I ain't through yet.". On the very next Rams possession, Thomas Henderson intercepted Ferragamo's pass along the sideline with 1:19 left in the game and returned it 68-yards for the final touchdown. While the touchdown interception return, and prior comments may have impressed millions of viewers, it was Henderson's celebratory football finger roll over the goal post that angered many others.

Henderson's TD celebration was later deemed by the media as "adding insult to injury", which amused Henderson and the millions of Cowboys fans worldwide. However, it also increased the huge divide between those who were already fans of the Cowboys and the people who hated them. With the win over the Rams the Cowboys advanced to the Super Bowl for the third time in four years to play a rematch of Super Bowl X against the Pittsburgh Steelers that would ultimately determine "The Team of the Decade".

Thomas Henderson's "controversial" comments before and during the NFC Championship game accelerated his already skyrocketing "Hollywood" persona into that of a pop-cultural phenomenon. Thomas Henderson was later featured on the cover of Time Magazine the week before the Super Bowl, and NBC anointed Henderson the "Muhammad Ali of the NFL" during the pre-game player introductions for Super Bowl XIII. ABC-TV decided to jump on the "Hollywood" Henderson band wagon by inviting him to compete on their popular annual Superstars competition immediately following the 28–0 victory over the Rams.

Awards and records
 Led NFL in sacks
 Led NFL, fewest rushing yards allowed (1,721)
 Led NFL, most rushing yards (2,783)
 Led NFL, points scored (384)
 Roger Staubach, NFL passing leader
 Roger Staubach, NFC leader, touchdown passes (25)

Milestones
 Tony Dorsett, second consecutive 1,000 yard rushing season (finished season with 1,325 yards, third in NFL)

Publications
The Football Encyclopedia 
Total Football 
Cowboys Have Always Been My Heroes

References

External links
 1978 Dallas Cowboys
 Pro Football Hall of Fame
 Dallas Cowboys Official Site
 Cowboys 1978 Highlight Film 1 of 2; "America's Team"
 Cowboys 1978 Highlight Film 2 of 2; "America's Team"

NFC East championship seasons
Dallas
Dallas Cowboys seasons
National Football Conference championship seasons
Dallas Cowboys